The 2000 Central Michigan Chippewas football team was an American football team that represented Central Michigan University in the Mid-American Conference (MAC) during the 2000 NCAA Division I-A football season. In their first season under head coach Mike DeBord, the Chippewas compiled a 2–9 record (2–6 against MAC opponents), finished in last place in the MAC's West Division, and were outscored by their opponents, 376 to 137. The team played its home games in Kelly/Shorts Stadium in Mount Pleasant, Michigan, with attendance of 94,949 in five home games. The team set a single season school record with 90 punts, and Brian Brandt set a school record with 87 punts.

The team's statistical leaders included Derrick Vickers with 1,059 passing yards, Vince Webber with 458 rushing yards, and David Hannah with 411 receiving yards. Senior defensive back Brian Leigeb set a single game school record with 26 tackles against Northern Illinois on November 18, 2000, totaled 147 tackles for the season, set a school record with 490 career tackles, and was selected as the team's most valuable player.

On December 1, 1999, Mike DeBord was hired as Central Michigan's head football coach. He had previously served as Michigan's offensive coordinator. DeBord was given a four-year contract with an annual base salary of $120,000.

Schedule

References

Central Michigan
Central Michigan Chippewas football seasons
Central Michigan Chippewas football